Major General Nathanael Greene is a bronze equestrian statue, by Henry Kirke Brown.
It is located in Stanton Park, Northeast, Washington, D.C., in the Capitol Hill neighborhood.

The inscription reads:

(Base, south side:)
(Base, north side:)

On June 6, 1930, the statue fell from its pedestal after the bolts gave out in summer heat.

As part of American Revolution Statuary in Washington, D.C. the statue is listed on the National Register of Historic Places.

See also
 List of public art in Washington, D.C., Ward 6

References

External links

1877 sculptures
Sculptures by Henry Kirke Brown
Greene
Bronze sculptures in Washington, D.C.
Capitol Hill
Equestrian statues in Washington, D.C.
Historic district contributing properties in Washington, D.C.
Sculptures of men in Washington, D.C.